The Shire of Hastings was a local government area about  south-southeast of Melbourne, the state capital of Victoria, Australia, encompassing the eastern extremity of the Mornington Peninsula.

History

The Mornington Road District was created on 6 November 1860, and became a shire on 24 November 1871. On 31 May 1893, it was renamed the Shire of Frankston and Hastings, and lost its western riding to the New Mornington Shire, which itself was later renamed the Shire of Mornington.

On 19 October 1960, the Central and Eastern Ridings of the Shire of Frankston were severed, and with parts of the Eastern Riding of the Shire of Flinders, were incorporated as the Shire of Hastings.

On 15 December 1994, the Shire of Hastings was abolished, and along with the Shires of Flinders and Mornington, and a small part of the City of Frankston, was merged into the newly created Shire of Mornington Peninsula. The Age reported in July 1994 that the result had been supported by Hastings and Mornington councils from the beginning, but opposed by Flinders, which wanted to merge with the southern coastal section of Hastings.

Council formerly met at the Shire Offices, at High Street and Marine Parade, Hastings. The facility is still used today by the Shire of Mornington Peninsula.

Wards

The Shire of Hastings was divided into four ridings, each of which elected three councillors:
 Balnarring Riding
 Bittern Riding
 Hastings Riding
 Somers Riding

Suburbs and localities
 Balnarring
 Balnarring Beach
 Baxter (shared with the Cities of Cranbourne and Frankston)
 Bittern
 Crib Point
 Hastings*
 HMAS Cerberus
 Merricks
 Merricks Beach
 Merricks North
 Moorooduc (shared with the Shire of Mornington)
 Point Leo
 Red Hill South
 Shoreham (shared with the Shire of Flinders)
 Somers
 Somerville
 Tyabb

* Council seat.

Population

* Estimate in the 1958 Victorian Year Book.

References

External links
 Victorian Places - Hastings

Hastings
Mornington Peninsula
1960 establishments in Australia
1994 disestablishments in Australia